The Hamar women's basketball team, commonly known as Hamar, is the women's basketball department of Íþróttafélagið Hamar, based in the town of Hveragerði, Iceland.

History
The team was the runner-up to the 2010 national championship. The following season it posted the best record in the league. In May 2020, the club announced that they would field a joint women's team with Þór Þorlákshöfn in the 1. deild kvenna during the upcoming season.

Trophies and awards

Trophies
1. deild kvenna (2):
2006, 2013

Awards
Úrvalsdeild Women's Domestic All-First Team
 Kristrún Sigurjónsdóttir – 2010

Úrvalsdeild Women's Young Player of the Year
 Marín Laufey Davíðsdóttir – 2014
 Guðbjörg Sverrisdóttir – 2010

Notable players

Coaches
 Andri Þór Kristinsson 2006–2007
 Ari Gunnarsson 2007–2009
 Ágúst Björgvinsson 2009–2011
 Lárus Jónsson 2011–2012
 Hallgrímur Brynjólfsson 2012–2015
 Oddur Benediktsson 2015–2016
 Kristinn Ólafsson 2017–2018
 Daði Steinn Arnarsson 2019–2020
 Hallgrímur Brynjólfsson 2020–present

References

External links
Official Website  
KKÍ: Hamar – kki.is  

Basketball teams in Iceland
Hamar (basketball)